= Hope Garden =

Hope Garden may refer to:

- Hope Garden in Saint Andrew Parish Jamaica on the campus of the University of the West Indies (Jamaica)
- Hope Garden in Manhattan's Battery Park
